"Green Garden" is a song by British singer Laura Mvula. It was released as the second single from her debut studio album Sing to the Moon (2013). It was released as a digital download in the United Kingdom on 22 February 2013.

Music video
A music video to accompany the release of "Green Garden" was first released onto YouTube on 17 January 2013 at a total length of three minutes and fifty seconds. It was filmed in Southern California at Descanso Gardens in La Cañada Flintridge and the Lincoln Heights neighborhood of Los Angeles.

Live performances
On 8 February 2013 she performed the song on The Graham Norton Show.

Critical reception
John Robinson of The Guardian gave the song a positive review stating:
"Laura Mvula has a voice like the Queen has a house: classy, and so big she doesn't need to use all of it at once. This very good debut single is duly a masterclass of restraint [...] the minimal, chiming repetitions of the production and Mvula's understated Nina Simone delivery are as much the key to the song's success as the eventual gospel explosion of the chorus."

Heat gave the song four stars out of five, calling it a "soulful tune".

Track listings

Chart performance
On 27 February 2013 the song was number 25 on the Official Chart Update. It ultimately debuted at number 32 on 3 March, moving up by one place to 31 a week later. On 28 February 2013 the song entered the Irish Singles Chart at number 77.

Weekly charts

Year-end charts

Release history

References

2013 singles
2013 songs
Laura Mvula songs
RCA Records singles